The Catepanate (or Catapanate) of Italy ( Katepaníkion Italías) was a province of the Byzantine Empire from 965 until 1071. At its greatest extent, it comprised mainland Italy south of a line drawn from Monte Gargano to the Gulf of Salerno. North of that line, Amalfi and Naples also maintained allegiance to Constantinople through the catepan. The Italian region of Capitanata derives its name from katepanikion.

History 
Following the fall of the Exarchate of Ravenna in 751, Byzantium had been absent from the affairs of southern Italy for almost a century, but the accession of Basil I (reigned 867–886) to the throne of Constantinople changed this: from 868 on, the imperial fleet and Byzantine diplomats were employed in an effort to secure the Adriatic Sea from Saracen raids, re-establish Byzantine dominance over Dalmatia, and extend Byzantine control once more over parts of Italy. As a result of these efforts, Otranto was taken from the Saracens in 873, and Bari, captured from Arabs by the Holy Roman Emperor Louis II in 871, passed under Byzantine control in 876. The expeditions of the capable general Nikephoros Phokas the Elder in the mid-880s further extended Byzantine control over most of Apulia and Calabria. These victories were followed up by his successors and laid the foundation of a resurgence of Byzantine power in southern Italy, culminating in the establishment of the theme of Longobardia in c. 892. The regions of Apulia, Calabria and Basilicata would remain firmly under Byzantine control until the 11th century. In c. 965, a new theme, that of Lucania, was established, and the stratēgos (military governor) of Bari was raised to the title of katepanō of Italy, usually with the rank of patrikios. The title of katepanō meant "the uppermost" in Greek.  This elevation was deemed militarily necessary after the final loss of nearby Sicily, a previously Byzantine possession, to the Arabs.

Some Norman adventurers, on pilgrimage to Monte Sant'Angelo sul Gargano, lent their swords in 1017 to the Lombard cities of Apulia against the Byzantines. From 1016 to 1030 the Normans were pure mercenaries, serving either Byzantine or Lombard, and then Duke Sergius IV of Naples, by installing their leader Ranulf Drengot in the fortress of Aversa in 1030. This gave the Normans their first foothold in southern Italy from which they began an organized conquest of the land. In 1030, William and Drogo, the two eldest sons of Tancred of Hauteville, a noble of Coutances in Normandy arrived in southern Italy. The two joined in the organized attempt to wrest Apulia from the Byzantines, who had lost most of that province by 1040. Bari was captured by the Normans in April 1071, and Byzantine authority was finally terminated in Italy, five centuries after the conquests of Justinian I. In 1154-1156, through a plan hatched by Emperor Manuel I Komnenos, the Byzantines returned briefly to besiege Bari and were moderately successful in inciting a mass revolt which nearly toppled Norman control (potentially handing much of the former Katepanate back to the Byzantine Empire), but the gains were "reversed by misfortune".

The title Catapan of Apulia and Campania was revived briefly in 1166 for Gilbert, Count of Gravina, the cousin of the queen regent Margaret of Navarre. In 1167, with his authority as catapan, Gilbert forced German troops out of the Campania and compelled Frederick Barbarossa to raise the siege of Ancona.

Catepans
970–975 Michael Abidelas
before 982 Romanos
982–985 Kalokyros Delphinas
985–988 Romanos
988–998 John Ammiropoulos
999–1006 Gregory Tarchaneiotes
1006–1008 Alexios Xiphias
1008–1010 John Kourkouas
1010–1016 Basil Mesardonites
May 1017 – December 1017 Leo Tornikios Kontoleon
December 1017 – 1027 Basil Boioannes
c. 1027–1029 Christophoros Burgaris
July 1029 – June 1032 Pothos Argyros
1032 – May 1033 Michael Protospatharios
May 1033 – 1038 Constantine Opos
1038–1039 Michael Spondyles
February 1039 – January 1040 Nikephoros Dokeianos
November 1040 – Summer of 1041 Michael Dokeianos
Summer 1041 – 1042 Exaugustus Boioannes
February 1042 – April 1042 Synodianos
April 1042 – September 1042 George Maniakes
Autumn 1042 Pardos
February 1043 – April 1043 Basil Theodorokanos
Autumn 1045 – September 1046 Eustathios Palatinos
September 1046 – December  1046 John Raphael
1050–1058 Argyrus
1060/1061 Marules
1062 Sirianus
1064–1068 Abulchares
1068 Perenos
1071 Stephen Pateranos

References

Sources
 Charanis, Peter. "On the Question of the Hellenization of Sicily and Southern Italy During the Middle Ages." The American Historical Review. Vol. 52, No. 1 (Oct., 1946), pp. 74–86.
 
  
 
 White, Lynn, Jr.. "The Byzantinization of Sicily." The American Historical Review. Vol. 42, No. 1 (Oct., 1936), pp. 1–21.

See also
Magna Graecia
Grecìa Salentina
Katepanikion
Catepanate of Ras

 
Provinces of the Byzantine Empire
11th century in Italy
10th century in Italy
Italian states
Geographical, historical and cultural regions of Italy